The men's wakeboard competition of the Water skiing events at the 2015 Pan American Games in Toronto were held from July 21 to July 22 at the Ontario Place West Channel. The defending champion was Andrew Adkison of the United States.

Results

Semifinal

Final

References

Water skiing at the 2015 Pan American Games